A penumbral lunar eclipse will take place on Tuesday, August 17, 2027. It will cause a subtle dimming as 54.56% of the Moon will cross within Earth's penumbral shadow.

Visibility 
It will be completely visible over the Americas, will be seen rising over New Zealand and eastern Australia, and setting over Portugal and western Africa.

Related eclipses

Eclipses in 2027
 An annular solar eclipse on 6 February.
 A penumbral lunar eclipse on 20 February.
 A penumbral lunar eclipse on 18 July.
 A total solar eclipse on 2 August.
 A penumbral lunar eclipse on 17 August.

Lunar year series

Saros series 

It is part of Saros cycle 148.

Metonic cycle (19 years)

Half-Saros cycle
A lunar eclipse will be preceded and followed by solar eclipses by 9 years and 5.5 days (a half saros). This lunar eclipse is related to two partial solar eclipses of Solar Saros 155.

See also 
List of lunar eclipses and List of 21st-century lunar eclipses

References

External links 
 Saros cycle 148
 

2027-08
2027-08
2027 in science